A tembel hat (Hebrew: kova tembel, כובע טמבל) is a hat which is an Israeli national symbol. The tembel hat was commonly worn by Jews in Israel from the beginning of the 20th century until the 1970s and was a symbol of hard-working, Zionist Israelis. It especially became associated with kibbutzim, tzabarim, and Israeli youth movements. In Israeli cartoons it is still used to symbolize the typical Israeli (e.g., the cartoon character Srulik). Tembel hats were most notably produced by the ATA textile company.

Etymology
In Hebrew slang, tembel means silly, stupid, or fool. It is not known whether the slang term was named after the hat or the hat after the slang term. There is a theory that the tembel hat was originally the heavy-duty hat of the Templars Christian movement that was active in Israel at the end of the 19th century and in the beginning of the 20th century. By this theory the hat's first name was "Templars' hat," but it was changed to "tembel hat" by the Arabs who could not pronounce the P and the correct vowels. However, it is more likely that the name "tembel hat" derives from the Turkish or Ottoman word "tembel" which means lazy. The Tembel's shape is the same as the pileus, the hat adopted by freed slaves in Greek and Roman antiquity and adopted as a symbol of freedom at the time of the French Revolution. The ancient pileus survived in Albania in the early 20th century and may have influenced the leaders of the 2nd Aliyah who adopted the hat.

See also
 Biblical sandals
 Bucket hat
 Israeli fashion
 Culture of Israel

References

Hats
Israeli culture
Israeli fashion
National symbols of Israel